Nikolai Genov (/Nikolaj Genow; born 1946) is an internationally respected sociologist of Bulgarian origin. He received his doctorate of Philosophy in sociology from the University of Leipzig in 1975 and his doctorate of Science from the Bulgarian Academy of Sciences in 1986. In 1990 he became a professor at BAS. Between 2002 and 2011 he was a professor of sociology at the Institute of Sociology and Institute of Eastern European Studies of the Free University of Berlin. From 2011 until 2016 he was the head of the Institute of Global and Regional Development at the School of Advanced Social Studies in Slovenia. He has conducted research and taught at the universities of Berkeley, Bielefeld, Frankfurt am Main, Cassel, Lund, Moscow, Rome, Seoul, and Warsaw.

From 1980 until 1990 Genov was the organizer of the International Varna Sociological School. From 1990 till 1992 he was co-director of the Centre for Research and Documentation in the Social Sciences (the Vienna Centre). From 1994 to 1996 he was vice-president of UNESCO's Management of Social Transformations (MOST) program. From 2003 to 2008 he was a member of the Advisory Board of the program. From 1996 until 1998 he was a member and from 1998 until 2002 vice-president of the International Social Science Council (ISSC, Paris). Between 2000 and 2010 he was Director of the UNESCO/ISSC International Summer School Comparative Research in the Social Sciences. From 2003 to 2005 he was Director of the Institute of Eastern European Studies at the Free University Berlin.

Research and teaching
Until 1989 Genov's research and teaching were mostly focused on topics of sociological theory and history of ideas. During this period he published the monographs "Talcott Parsons and the Theoretical Sociology" (1982) and "Rationality and Sociology" (1986) (in Bulgarian). After 1989 his research and teaching became increasingly occupied with transformation processes in various parts of the world and particularly in Eastern Europe. The monographs "The United States at the End of the XXth Century" (1991) and "The Rise of the Dragon: The Modernization of South Korea" (1994) as well as the collection "Risks of the Transition" (1994) (in Bulgarian) dealt with these topics. The publications on transformation issues were increasingly based on results of international comparative studies. This applies to the monograph "Managing Transformations in Eastern Europe" as well as to the edited volumes "Unemployment: Risks and Reactions" (1999)  and "Continuing Transformations in Eastern Europe" (2000) (in English). The content of the latter publications is guided by a synthesis of a broadly conceived concept of social interaction with a differentiated concept of societal transformation. The synthesis opens the prospect for complex studies on fundamental processes of accelerated commercialization of economy, the democratization of politics, universalization of value-normative systems, digitization of technologies, and the ecologization of thinking and behavior. The series of international comparative research projects on Eastern Europe coordinated by Genov included: Personal and Institutional Strategies for Coping with Transformation Risks (UNESCO/MOST, 1997-2001); Ethnic Relations in South-Eastern Europe (Stability Pact for South-Eastern Europe, 2003-2005); Inter-ethnic Integration (EU, 2005-2007); Migration in the Post-Soviet Space (Volkswagen Foundation, 2008-2010). The monograph "Global Trends in Eastern Europe"(2010, reprinted 2016) contains the detailed analysis and conclusions of the studies on the transformation of Eastern European societies. 
The monograph is a conceptual turning point since the theoretical framework used by Genov gradually changed from the focus on the concept of societal transformation to the development and use of the concept of global social trends. The new framework is organized around the idea of four such trends called upgrading the rationality of organizations, individualization, the spread of instrumental activism, and the universalization of value-normative systems. Based on the sociological paradigm of social interaction the framework of social trends was applied in local, regional, and global studies published in the edited volume "Global Trends and Regional Development"(2012) and in the monograph "Challenges of Individualization" (2018). The claim of Genov is that the turn from methodological societalism towards methodological globalism opens the way to a new stage in the development of sociological knowledge. The new stage is marked by the concentration of the sociological research interest on global social trends as the outcome of interactions at micro-, mezzo, and macro-social structural levels. As seen from another vantage point the theoretical and empirical studies have identified the global trends as the major factors for building, reproduction, and change of current and future local, regional and global social situations. The monograph “The Paradigm of Social Interaction” (2021) is a synthesis of fundamental ideas of sociological knowledge.

Publications
Nikolai Genov is an author with more than 350 scientific articles and books that have been published in 28 countries.

Book publications in English:
 1989: National Traditions in Sociology, SAGE(ed.) 
 1993: Society and Environment in the Balkan Countries (ed.) Regional and Global Development
 1993: Ethnicity and Politics in Bulgaria and Israel (co-ed.) Avebury
 1995: Human Development Report Bulgaria 1995 (ed.)  
 1996: Human Development Report Bulgaria 1996 (ed.)  
 1997: Human Development Report Bulgaria 1997 (ed.)  
 1999: Managing Transformations in Eastern Europe, UNESCO/MOST, 
 1999: Unemployment: Risks and Reactions (ed.)UNESCO/MOST, 
 2000: Continuing Transformation in Eastern Europe (ed.), Trafo, 
 2000: Labour Market and Unemployment in South-Eastern Europe (ed.) 
 2001: Recent Social Trends in Bulgaria (co-ed.) McQueens University Press, 
 2001: Social Sciences in South-Eastern Europe (ed.) ISSC and IZ , 
 2003: Prospects of Sociology in Bulgaria (ed.) REGLO  , 
 2004: Ethnic Relations in South-Eastern Europe (ed.) LIT-Verlag , 
 2004: Advances in Sociological Knowledge Over Half a Century (ed.), VS-Verlag, 
 2005: Ethnicity and Educational Policies in South Eastern Europe (ed.), LIT-Verlag, 
 2006: Ethnicity and Mass Media in South Eastern Europe. LIT-Verlag (ed.) 
 2007: Upgrading the Rationality of Organizations. FU, Institute of Eastern European Studies, ISSN 1864-533X
 2007: Comparative Research in the Social Sciences (ed.), ISSC, 
 2008: Interethnic Integration in Five European Societies, (ed.) Krämer, 
 2010: Global Trends in Eastern Europe. Ashgate, 
 2011: Transboundary Migration in the Post-Soviet Space (co-ed.), Peter Lang, 
 2012: Global Trends and Regional Development, (ed.), Routledge, 
 2016: Global Trends in Eastern Europe (reprint). Routledge, 
 2018: Challenges of Individualization. Palgrave Macmillan, 
 2021: The Paradigm of Social Interaction. London and New York ,

External links
 Curriculum Vitae
 List of Publications
 Official Website

Bulgarian sociologists
1946 births
Living people
Bulgarian expatriates in Germany